Werner von Bolton (8 April 1868 – 28 October 1912) was a German chemist and materials scientist. He devised a technique for producing filaments for incandescent light bulb made out of tantalum in 1902.

Life

Werner von Bolton was born in Tbilisi, Georgia. He went on to study Chemistry at the Technische Hochschule Berlin and in Leipzig. Post-Graduation, von Bolton worked at the company Siemens & Halske in Berlin. In 1895 he achieved his doctorate.

In 1902 von Bolton detected the benefits of using Tantalum as a material in the production of filaments. Tantalum allowed for a greater luminosity with lower energy consumption when compared with previous alternatives such as coal.

In 1905, Siemens & Halske awarded von Bolton the position of director of the first central laboratory of the company, later the Physics and Chemistry laboratory.

After 1910, the bulbs with a tantalum filament were replaced by those with a tungsten filament.

Von Bolton died in Berlin on 28 October 1912. He is honoured with the Boltonstraße, a street named after him in Siemensstadt, an area of Berlin's Spandau district.

References

External links
Siemens: Scientists and engineers
Lexicon Siemensstadt: Werner von Bolton

1868 births
1912 deaths
19th-century German chemists
German materials scientists
Scientists from Tbilisi
20th-century German chemists